Coenonympha is a butterfly genus belonging to the Coenonymphina, a subtribe of the browns (Satyrinae). The latter are a subfamily of the brush-footed butterflies (Nymphalidae). As a rule, Palearctic species are colloquially called heaths, while Nearctic ones are called ringlets. Neither term is limited to members of this genus, however.

Selected species
Listed alphabetically:

 Coenonympha amaryllis Stoll, 1782
 Coenonympha ampelos Edwards, 1871 – northwest ringlet
 Coenonympha arcania (Linnaeus, 1761) – pearly heath
 Coenonympha arcanioides Pierret, 1837 – Moroccan pearly heath
 Coenonympha caeca Staudinger, 1886
 Coenonympha california Westwood, 1851 – California ringlet
 Coenonympha corinna (Hübner, 1804) – Corsican heath [Corsica, Sardinia, Elba] 
 Coenonympha darwiniana Staudinger, 1871 (sometimes in C. gardetta, or C. arcania × C. gardetta)
 Coenonympha (darwiniana) macromma Turati & Verity 1910
 Coenonympha × decolorata Wagner, 1913 (= C. mahometana × C. sunbecca)
 Coenonympha dorus (Esper, 1782) – dusky heath
 Coenonympha fettigii Oberthür, 1874
 Coenonympha gardetta (de Prunner, 1798) – Alpine heath [Alps, northern Balkans]
 Coenonympha glycerion (Borkhausen, 1788) – chestnut heath
 Coenonympha haydenii Edwards, 1872 – Hayden's ringlet, Wyoming ringlet, Yellowstone ringlet
 Coenonympha hero (Linnaeus, 1761) – scarce heath
 Coenonympha inornata Edwards, 1861 – prairie ringlet
 Coenonympha iphioides Staudinger, 1870 – Spanish heath
 Coenonympha kodiak Edwards, 1869 – Kodiak ringlet
 Coenonympha leander Esper, 1784 – Russian heath
 Coenonympha mahometana Alphéraky, 1881
 Coenonympha mangeri Bang Haas, 1927
 Coenonympha mongolica Alphéraky, 1881
 Coenonympha nipisiquit McDunnough, 1939 – maritime ringlet
 Coenonympha nolckeni Erschoff, 1874
 Coenonympha ochracea Edwards, 1861 – ocher ringlet
 Coenonympha oedippus (Fabricius, 1787) – false ringlet
 Coenonympha pamphilus (Linnaeus, 1758) – small heath
 Coenonympha pavonina Alphéraky, 1888
 Coenonympha rhodopensis Elwes, 1900 – eastern large heath [Italy, Romania, Bulgaria, Albania, N.Greece, Yugoslavia]
 Coenonympha saadi Kollar, 1849
 Coenonympha semenovi Alphéraky, 1887
 Coenonympha sinica Alphéraky, 1888
 Coenonympha sunbecca Eversmann, 1843
 Coenonympha symphita Lederer, 1870
 Coenonympha thyrsis Freyer, 1845
 Coenonympha tullia (Müller, 1764) – large heath, common ringlet
 Coenonympha tydeus Leech, 1892
 Coenonympha vaucheri Blachier, 1905 – Vaucher's heath
 Coenonympha xinjiangensis Chou & Huang, 1994

Gallery

Footnotes

References

"Coenonympha Hübner, [1819]" at Markku Savela's Lepidoptera and Some Other Life Forms

 
Satyrini
Butterfly genera
Taxa named by Jacob Hübner